Hypostomus careopinnatus is a species of catfish in the family Loricariidae. It is native to South America, where it occurs in the Taquari River basin in the upper Paraguay River drainage of Brazil. The species reaches 5.8 cm (2.3 inches) in standard length and is believed to be a facultative air-breather. Unusually among species of Hypostomus, H. careopinnatus lacks an adipose fin. Although Hypostomus levis also lacks an adipose fin, this characteristic is thought to have evolved independently.

References 

Fish described in 2012
careopinnatus